Kateh Shamshir-e Olya (also Romanized as Kateh Shamshīr-e ‘Olyā; also known as Ḩājjī Sham Shīr, Kalāteh-ye Shamshīr Bālā, Kateh Shamshīr Bālā, Kateh Shamshīr-e Bālā, Kat-i-Shamshīr, Khachi Shamshīr, and Khachi Shamsīr) is a village in Qalandarabad Rural District, Qalandarabad District, Fariman County, Razavi Khorasan Province, Iran. At the 2006 census, its population was 1,516, in 336 families.

References 

Populated places in Fariman County